The Rhodopes (Rodopi) are a mountain range in Southeastern Europe, and the largest by area in Bulgaria, with over 83% of its area in the southern part of the country and the remainder in Greece. The mountain range gives its name to the terrestrial ecoregion Rodope montane mixed forests that belongs in the temperate broadleaf and mixed forests biome and the Palearctic realm. The region is particularly notable for its karst areas with their deep river gorges, large caves and specific sculptured forms, such as the Trigrad Gorge.

A significant part of Bulgaria's hydropower resources are located in the western areas of the range. There are a number of hydro-cascades and dams used for electricity production, irrigation, and as tourist destinations. In Greece, there are also the hydroelectric power plants of Thisavros and Platanovrysi. The Rhodopes have a rich cultural heritage including ancient Thracian sites such as Perperikon, Tatul and Belintash, and medieval castles, churches, monasteries, and picturesque villages with traditional Bulgarian architecture from the 18th and 19th centuries.

Name and mythology
The name of the Rhodope Mountains is of Thracian origin. Rhod-ope (Род-oпа) is interpreted as the first name of a river, meaning "rusty/reddish river", where Rhod- has the same Indo-European root as the Bulgarian "руда" (ore, "ruda"), "ръжда" (rust, "rǎžda"), "риж" (red-haired, "riž"), Latin "rufus" (red), German "rot" (red), English "red", Greek ροδ- (rodh).

In Greek mythology, Queen Rhodope of Thrace, the wife of King Haemus of Thrace, offended the gods, and was changed into a mountain by Zeus and Hera as a punishment along with her husband.

The mountains are also associated with the mythic figure of Orpheus.

In the Middle Ages, the mountains were known as the Slavey Mountains (Slaveyev Mountains), and under Ottoman rule were known as the Dospatsky Mountains, after the Dospat Municipality and Dospat River.

Geography 

In geomorphological terms, the Rhodopes are part of the Rila-Rhodope massif, which is the oldest landmass on the Balkan peninsula. They have the greatest extent of any single mountain range in Bulgaria. To the north the mountain slopes descend steeply towards the Upper Thracian Plain. To the west, the Rhodopes reach the Avram saddle, Yundola and the valley of the Mesta River. To the south and east they extend to the coastal plains of Greek Thrace. The Rhodopes are a complex system of ridges and deep river valleys.

Fifteen reserves have been established in the region, some of which are under UNESCO protection. The mountains are famous for the largest coniferous woods in the Balkans, their mild relief and the lush vegetation in the western parts as well as the abundance of birds of prey in the eastern areas.

Climate 

The location of the Rhodopes in the southeastern part of the Balkan Peninsula largely determines the climate in the region. It is influenced both by the colder air coming from the north and by the warmer breeze from the Mediterranean.

The mild climate, combined with some other factors, works in favour of the development of recreation and tourist activities. The Pamporovo resort, where the microclimate permits a heavy snow cover to be preserved for a long time, is an excellent example.

Waters 

The mountains have abundant water reserves, with a dense network of mountain springs and rivers. Nearly 80% of the mountain's territory falls within the drainage of the river Maritsa. The natural lakes are few, the most renown of these being the Smolyan lakes situated at several kilometers from the town of the same name. Some of the largest dams in the country are located in the Rhodopes including the Dospat Dam, Batak Dam, Golyam Beglik, Kardzhali Dam, Studen Kladenets, Vacha Dam, Shiroka Polyana and many others, while in Greece there are the dams of Thisavros and Platanovrysi. They are used mainly for hydro-electric power generation and for irrigation. There are many mineral water springs, the most famous being in Velingrad, Narechen, Devin, Beden, Mihalkovo and others. In Greece there are mineral water springs in Thermes, 40 km. north of (Xanthi) and in Thermia, 60 km. north of Drama, at 620 m.

Subdivision

Western Rhodopes 

The Western Rhodopes are the largest (66% of the area of the Rhodopes in Bulgaria), higher, most infrastructurally developed, and most visited part of the mountains. Among the other popular peaks are Shirokolashki Snezhnik, Golyam Persenk, Batashki Snezhnik, Turla.

Some of the deepest river gorges in the Rhodopes are located in the western parts, as well as the rock phenomenon Wonderful Bridges. Significant bodies of water include the Chaira lakes and the Dospat, Batak, Shiroka Polyana, Golyam Beglik and Tsigov Chark dams.

The town of Batak is also located in this part of the mountains, as well as the popular tourist centres Smolyan, Velingrad, Devin, Chepelare, the winter resort Pamporovo, the Eastern Orthodox Bachkovo Monastery, the ruins of the Asen dynasty's fortress, and the Devil's Throat, Yagodinska, and Uhlovitsa caves. The highest village in Bulgaria, Manastir (over ), is crouched in the northern foot of Prespa Peak. A number of architectural reserves, such as Shiroka Laka, Kovachevitsa, Momchilovtsi, Kosovo, are also located in the area.

Eastern Rhodopes 
The Eastern Rhodopes are spread over a territory of about 34% of the mountains' area in Bulgaria, constituting a much lower part.

The large artificial dams Kardzhali and Studen Kladenets are located in this part of the mountains. The region is rich in thermal mineral springs. The waters around Dzhebel have national reputation for healing various diseases. Belite Brezi is an important healing centre for respiratory and other ailments.

Major cities in the area are Haskovo and Kardzhali, as well as the smaller Momchilgrad, Krumovgrad, Zlatograd and Kirkovo. The Eastern Rhodopes, being significantly lower, are also more populated than the western part.

Almost every species of the European birds of prey nest in the rocks and forests of the Eastern Rhodopes including the rare black vulture and Egyptian vulture.

Southern (Greek) Rhodopes 

The Southern Rhodopes are the part of the mountain range that is located in Greece. The Rhodope regional unit in the northern part of the country is named after the region. This area includes the Rodopi Mountain Range National Park.
 
The Southern Rhodopes are characterized by numerous peaks of relatively low altitude. Their highest peak is Delimposka (1,953m) in the mountain of Frakto, near the Greek-Bulgarian border. Nowadays the Southern Rhodopes is an area almost deserted. After World War II and the Greek Civil War most villages depopulated permanently and their inhabitants never returned. Even the Sarakatsani stockbreeders abandoned the difficult life of the Rhodopes. The depopulation of the region, that has not been grazed for more than 50 years, combined with high rainfall and its geographical location, has contributed to the creation and maintenance of a biological paradise. There grow coniferous trees, such as the Norway Spruce and the Silver Birch, that cannot be found elsewhere in Greece.

In the forest of Frakto there are 300-year-old trees, more than 50 metres high, and the endangered wild goat.

In the eastern part of the region there is the well known nature reserve of Dadia Forest, an ideal habitat for birds of prey, with 36 of the 38 species of birds of prey of Europe, like the rare Eastern imperial eagle and Lesser spotted eagle.

History 

The Rhodopes have been inhabited since the Prehistoric age. There have been many archaeological finds of ancient tools in some of the caves.

The first known human inhabitants in the mountains were the Thracians. They built many temples, cities and fortresses. The most famous town in the area is the sacred city of Perperikon located 15 km northeast of Kardzhali. One of the most important Thracian temples was Tatul near the village of the same name. Additionally, there are archeological sites throughout the region related to the cult of Dionysus, such as the ancient Thracian city of Perperikon.

The frequent mention of the Rhodope in Ancient Greek and Latin sources indicates that the mountain had played an important role in the political and religious life of the Thracian tribes that lived on it. On the tops of the mountain there was a famous oracle, which they had visited to consult Alexander the Great and later the father of Octavian Augustus. On the mountain were also sanctuaries of various other deities, as was Apollo, Zeus, the Thracian Horseman, Mithras, etc. Finally, Rhodope served as a true bastion of freedom of the Thracians and last refuge of resistance against the Romans. This explains the fact that Thrace became a Roman province about 200 years after Macedonia.

In 2005, German scholars from the University of Heidelberg confirmed that the two rather small fragments discovered by archaeologist Nikolay Ovcharov in the Eastern Rhodopes mountains are written in the Minoan Linear A script from about 15th century BC.

In the Middle Ages the mountain was part of the Bulgarian and Byzantine Empires and often changed hands between the two countries. There was a dense network of castles which guarded the trade routes and the strategic heights. The largest and most important castles include Lyutitsa, Ustra, Tsepina, Mezek, Asenova krepost and many others. Between 1371 and 1375 the Rhodopes fell under Ottoman occupation in the course of the Bulgarian–Ottoman wars.

During the 16th and 17th centuries the Ottoman authorities began a process of Islamisation of the region.

The towns and the villages in the Western Rhodopes took active part in the April Uprising in 1876. When the uprising was crushed the Ottomans slaughtered around 5,000 people in Batak alone. Thousands more perished in Bratsigovo, Perushtitsa and other rebel villages which were also burnt and looted by the Ottomans.

The northern Rhodopes were ceded in 1878 to an autonomous province of Eastern Rumelia until its unification with the Principality of Bulgaria. The other part of the Rhodopes was annexed as a result of the First Balkan War (1912–1913) but after the Second Balkan War (1913) and the First World War (1914–1918) the southern slopes of the mountain was occupied by Greece and the Bulgarian population of the area was forced to flee to Bulgaria.

People 

The sparsely populated area of the Rhodopes has been a place of ethnic and religious diversity for hundreds of years. Apart from the Eastern Orthodox Bulgarians and Greeks, the mountains are also home to a number of Muslim communities, including the Pomaks, that predominate in the western parts and a large concentration of Bulgarian and Greek Turks, particularly in the Eastern Rhodopes. The mountains are also one of the regions associated with the Sarakatsani, a nomadic Greek people who traditionally roamed between Northern Thrace and the Aegean coast. Aromanians, a Romance-speaking ethnic group, also live in the Rhodopes.

Economy 

The economy of the Rhodopes region is dominated by services, tourism, industry and agriculture.

Livestock breeding, forestry and tobacco are the most important agricultural activities. Due to the large Muslim population the number of pigs is relatively low but there are many sheep which are traditional for the Rhodopes. Tobacco is grown in the Eastern Rhodopes and forms a large part of the total national production.

The industrial sector is well-developed. One of the largest industries in the area is mining. There are around 80 mines for lead and zinc whose reserves are among the largest in Europe. They are situated mainly in central parts of the mountain and along the border with Greece as well as to the east. Kardzhali Province is rich in non-metalliferous minerals and gold. There are also small reserves of chromite and iron ore as well as significant impurities of rare metals in the lead and zinc ores. There are several flotation factories which enrich the ores before it is sent to the large lead and zinc refineries in Kardzhali and Plovdiv. The machine-building industry is developed in Smolyan, Kardzhali, Devin, Bratsigovo, Ivailovgrad and others; there is a pharmaceutical plant in Pestera. Some of the centers of textile industry include Zlatograd, Smolyan, Madan, Laki. The timber industry is developed mainly in the western parts where there are some of the most important forest massifs in the Balkan Peninsula. The Rhodopes are one of the main hydro-power generation regions of Bulgaria with a number of major hydroelectric power plants such as Batak, Peshtera, Aleko, Studen Kladenets, Kardzhali, Vacha and Thisavros and Platanovrysi in Greece.

Tourism is an important industry with growing significance. Pamporovo and Chepelare are major winter resorts and during summer there is a number of resorts, camp sites and refuges on the shores of the dams or in the green valleys. The caves along the Greek border such as Yagodinska, Uhlovitsa, Devil's Throat Cave, Snezhanka (near Peshtera) and others are popular among speleologists with their spectacular forms and underground lakes and rivers. The ruins of castles, Thracian sites such as Perperikon and Tatul, the villages in National Revival style and the monasteries are also visited by many Bulgarian and foreign tourists.

Honour
Rodopi Peak on Livingston Island in the South Shetland Islands, Antarctica is named after the Rhodope Mountains.

See also

Geography of Bulgaria
List of mountains in Bulgaria
List of mountains of the Balkans
List of mountain ranges
Mantaritza Biosphere Reserve
Rila
Pirin
Balkan Mountains
Vitosha

References 

 Asdracha, Catherine, La région des Rhodopes aux XIIIe et XIVe siècles: étude de géographie historique, Athen: Verlag der Byzantinisch-Neugriechischen Jahrbücher, 1976, p. 294.
 Evangelos A. Papathanassiou. "The Armenian Presence in and around the Rhodope Mountain in 11th C.: Rethinking over some new archaeological Finds", Περὶ Θράκης 7 (2010–2015), 59–97.In: auth.academia.edu/EvangelosPapathanassiou

External links

 The ancient city of Perperikon
 Hiking in Rhodope Mountains
Madan ore field at Mindat.org

 
Mountain ranges of Bulgaria
Mountain ranges of Greece
Geography of Southeastern Europe
International mountains of Europe
Bulgaria–Greece border
Landforms of Smolyan Province
Landforms of Pazardzhik Province
Landforms of Kardzhali Province
Landforms of Haskovo Province
Landforms of Blagoevgrad Province
Landforms of Rhodope (regional unit)
Landforms of Xanthi (regional unit)